Eric Moore may refer to:
 Eric Moore (footballer, born 1925) (1925–2017), Australian rules footballer for Fitzroy
 Eric Moore (footballer, born 1948), Australian rules footballer for Richmond and South Melbourne
 Eric Moore (footballer, born 1926) (1926–2004), English football (soccer) player
 Eric Moore (defensive end) (born 1981), American football player for New York Giants, New Orleans Saints, St. Louis Rams, and New England Patriots
 Eric Moore (offensive lineman) (born 1965), American football player for New York Giants, Cincinnati Bengals, Cleveland Browns and Miami Dolphins
 Eric Moore, former drummer of Suicidal Tendencies
 Eric Moore, former drummer of King Gizzard & the Lizard Wizard
 Eric Moore, frontman of The Godz